Gibbs (usually pronounced ) is a surname.

Notable people with the surname
Alan Gibbs (born 1939), New Zealand-born businessman, entrepreneur and art collector
Alfred Gibbs (1823–1868), brigadier general in the Union Army during the American Civil War
Alfred W. Gibbs, Chief Mechanical Engineer of the Pennsylvania Railroad
Antony Gibbs (1756–1816), founder of British trading company Antony Gibbs & Sons
Antony Gibbs (1925–2016), British film and television editor
Armstrong Gibbs (1889–1960), English composer
Brian Gibbs (1936–2014), English footballer and manager
Caleb Gibbs (1748–1818), American soldier, commander of George Washington's "life guard"
Calvin Gibbs, US Army soldier convicted of the murder of three Afghan civilians in 2010
Charles Gibbs, pseudonym of American pirate James D. Jeffers (1798–1831)
Cory Gibbs (born 1980), American soccer player
Coy Gibbs (1972-2022), American NASCAR driver, football player, and coach
Dick Gibbs (1892–1915), Australian rules footballer
Dick Gibbs (basketball) (born 1948), American basketball player
Donnie Gibbs (1945–2006), American football player
Drew Gibbs (1962–2021), American college football coach
Frederic A. Gibbs (1903–1992), American neurologist
Frederick Gibbs (educationalist) (1866–1953), New Zealand school principal, educationalist and community leader
Frederick S. Gibbs (1845–1903), American politician from New York
Frederick J. Gibbs (1899–1963), British World War I flying ace
Fredia Gibbs (born 1963) American martial artist, kickboxer and boxer
Geoff Gibbs (1940–2006), Australian actor and drama teacher
George Gibbs (disambiguation), several people
Georgia Gibbs (1918–2006), American popular singer
Henry Gibbs (1630/1–1713), British oil painter
Herschelle Gibbs (born 1974), South African cricketer
Humphrey Gibbs (1902–1990), British governor of Southern Rhodesia
Ione Wood Gibbs (c.1871–1923), American educator, journalist, and clubwoman
J. D. Gibbs (Jason Dean Gibbs, 1969–2019), American racing driver
Jahmyr Gibbs (born 2002), American football player
Jake Gibbs (born 1938), American baseball player and college sports coach
James Gibbs (disambiguation), several people
Janie Lou Gibbs (1932–2010), American serial killer
Janno Gibbs (born 1969), Philippine singer-songwriter, actor and comedian
Joe Gibbs (born 1940), American football coach and motorsport team owner
Joe Gibbs (record producer) (1942–2008; born Joel Gibson), Jamaican record producer
Joe Gibbs (cricketer) (1946–2011), Grenadian cricketer
John Gibbs (disambiguation), several people
Jonathan Gibbs (disambiguation), several people
Josiah Willard Gibbs, Sr. (1790–1861), American linguist
Josiah Willard Gibbs (1839–1903), American mathematical physicist
Julia de Wolf Gibbs (1866–1952), American author and craftsman
Keith Gibbs (born 1933), South African cricketer
Kieran Gibbs (born 1989), English football player
Lance Gibbs  (born 1934), West Indies cricketer
Leonard Gibbs (1948–2021), American percussionist
Leonard W. H. Gibbs (1875–1930), New York politician
Lilian Gibbs (1870–1925), British botanist
Madarious Gibbs (born 1993), American basketball player
Marla Gibbs (born 1931), American actress
Mary Elizabeth Gibbs (1836–1920), New Zealander
May Gibbs (1877–1969), Australian children's author, illustrator and cartoonist
Michael Gibbs (disambiguation), several people
Mifflin Wistar Gibbs (1823–1915), American-Canadian politician, businessman, and advocate for Black rights
Nigel Gibbs (born 1965), English professional football manager and former player
Nicholas Gibbs (1733–1817), early American pioneer. 
Nicole Gibbs (born 1993), American tennis player
Norman E. Gibbs (1941–2002), American software engineer, scholar and educational leader
Norman Gibbs (Canadian football) (born 1960), American football player
Oliver Wolcott Gibbs (1822–1908), American chemist
Pat Gibbs (born 1950), American football player
Patrick Gibbs (1915–2008), Welsh World War II pilot, author and film critic
Paul Gibbs (disambiguation), several people
Peter Gibbs (disambiguation), several people
Sir Philip Gibbs (1877–1962), English journalist and novelist
Reggie Gibbs (1882–1938), Welsh international rugby player
Robert Gibbs (disambiguation), several people
Roger Gibbs (1934–2018), British financier
Roland Gibbs (1921–2004), British military officer
Ronald James Gibbs (born 1947), known as Ronaldo Valdez, Philippine actor
Scott Gibbs (born 1971), Welsh rugby footballer
Terri Gibbs (born 1954), American country music artist
Terry Gibbs (born 1924), American jazz musician (vibraphone)
Thomas Gibbs (disambiguation), several people
Timothy Gibbs (born 1967), American director, actor, producer, and screenwriter
William Gibbs (disambiguation), several people
Wolcott Gibbs (1902–1958), American editor, humorist, theatre critic, playwright and author

Fictional characters with the surname
Leroy Jethro Gibbs, main character of American TV series 'NCISJoshamee Gibbs, character in American Pirates of the Caribbean'' films

See also
Gibb (surname)
Gibbes (surname)

References

English-language surnames
Surnames of English origin
Patronymic surnames
Surnames from given names